Ross Welford is an English children's science-fiction/fantasy author.

Biography

Welford was born in Cullercoats, a small seaside town in the north-east of England. He attended Marden High School and studied English at Leeds University before becoming a magazine journalist and then a television producer.

Career

He first started writing his debut novel, Time Travelling With A Hamster, in 2014. It was published in 2016 and was shortlisted for the Costa, Blue Peter, Waterstones, and Branford Boase Awards.

It was followed by eight other novels between 2017 and 2023.

Other information 

Welford was admitted into The Magic Circle in 2019.

Cullercoats appears as 'Culvercot' in Welford's books.

Bibliography

References

External links
 

English children's writers
English science fiction writers
Living people
Year of birth missing (living people)
People from Cullercoats
Writers from Tyne and Wear